KMPT (930 AM) is a radio station licensed to serve East Missoula, Montana.  The station is owned by Townsquare Media.  It airs a talk radio format.

History

KYSS signed on the air June 27, 1959. Treasure State Broadcasting signed the station on after having acquired the construction permit, briefly known as KDOO, in 1958. KYSS-FM was started by the station in 1969.

Prior to acquiring the new call sign, KMPT was known as KLCY. The station changed to its current call letters on January 1, 2008.

Ownership
In October 2007, a deal was reached for the station (then known as KLCY) to be acquired by GAP Broadcasting II LLC (Erik Hellum, president) from Clear Channel Communications as part of a 57 station deal with a total reported sale price of $74.78 million.  What eventually became GapWest Broadcasting was folded into Townsquare Media on August 13, 2010.

References

External links
Official Website
 Flash Stream, MP3 Stream

MPT
Talk radio stations in the United States
Radio stations established in 1959
Townsquare Media radio stations